The A 12 road is an A-Grade trunk road in Sri Lanka. It connects the Puttalam with Trincomallee.

The A 12 passes through Karuwalagaswewa, Palugassegama, Kala Oya, Nochchiyagama, Maha Bulankulama, Anuradhapura, Mihintale, Tammanewa, Kahatagasdigiliya, Morakewa, Horowapotana, Morawewa (Muthalikulam), Pankulam and Kanniya to reach Trincomallee.

References

Highways in Sri Lanka
Transport in Eastern Province, Sri Lanka